Kazumichi Takada is a Japanese mixed martial artist. He competed in the Lightweight division.

Mixed martial arts record

|-
| Loss
| align=center| 3-4-1
| Tatsuya Kawajiri
| Technical Submission (triangle armbar)
| Shooto: To The Top 9
| 
| align=center| 1
| align=center| 3:03
| Tokyo, Japan
| 
|-
| Win
| align=center| 3-3-1
| Masato Ogura
| Submission (rear naked choke)
| Shooto: Wanna Shooto 2001
| 
| align=center| 1
| align=center| 4:35
| Setagaya, Tokyo, Japan
| 
|-
| Loss
| align=center| 2-3-1
| Yohei Suzuki
| Decision (unanimous)
| Shooto: R.E.A.D. 6
| 
| align=center| 2
| align=center| 5:00
| Tokyo, Japan
| 
|-
| Loss
| align=center| 2-2-1
| Makoto Ishikawa
| Decision (unanimous)
| Shooto: R.E.A.D. 4
| 
| align=center| 2
| align=center| 5:00
| Setagaya, Tokyo, Japan
| 
|-
| Loss
| align=center| 2-1-1
| Takanori Gomi
| TKO (punches)
| Shooto: Devilock Fighters
| 
| align=center| 2
| align=center| 3:42
| Tokyo, Japan
| 
|-
| Draw
| align=center| 2-0-1
| Takenori Ito
| Draw
| Shooto: Las Grandes Viajes 5
| 
| align=center| 2
| align=center| 5:00
| Tokyo, Japan
| 
|-
| Win
| align=center| 2-0
| Hiroki Kotani
| Decision (majority)
| Shooto: Las Grandes Viajes 3
| 
| align=center| 2
| align=center| 5:00
| Tokyo, Japan
| 
|-
| Win
| align=center| 1-0
| Satoshi Fujisaki
| Decision (unanimous)
| Shooto: Gig '98 1st
| 
| align=center| 2
| align=center| 5:00
| Tokyo, Japan
|

See also
List of male mixed martial artists

References

Japanese male mixed martial artists
Lightweight mixed martial artists
Living people
Year of birth missing (living people)